Ali Şahin (1921–1972) was a Turkish politician who served as a Member of Parliament for Gaziantep from Democrat Party (DP) between 1957–1960.

References 

1921 births
1972 deaths
Democrat Party (Turkey, 1946–1961) politicians
Istanbul University Faculty of Law alumni
Members of the 11th Parliament of Turkey
Turkish Sunni Muslims
Turkish prosecutors
Deputies of Gaziantep
People from Gaziantep